Arthur Max (born May 1, 1946) is an American production designer.

Biography
The native New Yorker began his career as a stage lighting designer in the music industry following graduation from New York University in the late 1960s. Those assignments included work at Bill Graham's famous music venue The Fillmore East in New York's East Village, and the historic Woodstock Festival of 1969. During the following decade, he designed concert lighting and festival stages for many rock and jazz artists. He was Pink Floyd's lighting designer during the bands' tours in the US and around the world in the early-1970s as well as with Marc Bolan’s T-Rex. After studying architecture in England (earning degrees in the early-1980s from the Polytechnic of Central London and the Royal College of Art), Max went on to do several architectural design projects in London including an award-winning lighting design for the stage of St John's Concert Hall, a former 18th Century church in the centre of Smith Square, Westminster, London.

He entered the British film industry as an assistant to several English production designers. First for Stuart Craig on Hugh Hudson's "Greystoke: The Legend of Tarzan, Lord of the Apes" and "Cal" (both 1984), then for Ashetton Gorton on Hudson's "Revolution" the following year. He commenced his own production design career in TV commercials over a period of ten years from 1985 to 1995 (for such clients as Pepsi, Nike, Jeep, Coke and Levi's), which led to his ongoing associations with directors Scott and Fincher.

Awards
Max has been nominated for three Academy Awards: once each for his Production Design work on Gladiator (2000), American Gangster (2007), and The Martian (2015). In addition to his Oscar nominations, Max won several other honors for his production design on the film, including the BAFTA, the National Board of Review prize and the Broadcast Film Critics honor. He also collected two "Excellence in Production Design" Awards from the Art Directors Guild, the first for Gladiator and the second for The Martian. He was previously nominated for Black Hawk Down, Robin Hood, American Gangster, Prometheus and Panic Room. After The Martian (film), Max worked on All the Money in the World (2017) Exodus: Gods and Kings, The Counselor, Kingdom of Heaven, Robin Hood, Black Hawk Down, and Body of Lies. His first job as a Production Designer was Fincher's 1995 thriller, Seven. More recently he completed The Last Vermeer (2019)  which was based on a true story of art forgery, set in Holland just after World War II , and his last project was the soon to be released The Last Duel (2020) . Subsequently he worked on House of Gucci  on location in Italy marking his 15th project with Director Ridley Scott, and is currently preparing "Kitbag" an historical epic about the rise and fall of Napoleon Buonaparte to be filmed in 2022.

Filmography

References

External links

Arthur Max papers, Margaret Herrick Library, Academy of Motion Picture Arts and Sciences

1946 births
Alumni of the Royal College of Art
Alumni of the University of Westminster
American art directors
20th-century American Jews
American production designers
Living people
New York University
Artists from New York City
Best Production Design BAFTA Award winners
21st-century American Jews